Distancing Socially is an American comedy film directed and written by Chris Blake. The film stars Rory Scovel, Jessika Van, Alan Tudyk, Melanie Chandra, Sarah Levy, Connor Paolo, Andy Buckley, and Jim O'Heir.

The film was shot remotely on the iPhone 11 Pro at the height of the COVID-19 pandemic in 2020. Variety premiered the film's trailer on August 18, 2021, and announced that Cinedigm had acquired the North American rights to the film. It was released on October 5, 2021, by Cinedigm.

Premise

Composed of a series of short vignettes that share a telecommunications application as a common thread, Distancing Socially focuses on loosely connected human interactions taking place virtually across a world in lockdown. The film is said to explore love, friendship, and the idea that a world of increased connectivity ironically leads to greater miscommunication.

Cast
The cast includes :
 Rory Scovel
 Jessika Van
 Alan Tudyk
 Melanie Chandra
 Sarah Levy
 Connor Paolo
 Andy Buckley
 Jim O'Heir
 Emma Fitzpatrick
 Blythe Howard
 Sierra Katow
 Jay Larson
 Dawan Owens
 Willie Macc
 Ted Welch
 Graham Outerbridge
 Matthew Hancock

Release
It was released on October 5, 2021, by Cinedigm.

References

External links
 
 

2021 films
American comedy films
2021 independent films
2021 LGBT-related films
American LGBT-related films
American independent films
2021 comedy films
2020s English-language films
2020s American films